The Pacific Rugby Premiership (officially called the Samurai Sportswear Pacific Rugby Premiership for sponsorship reasons) is the highest level club rugby competition in the USA. It serves as the Division I league for the Pacific North Conference, but also includes one team from the Frontier Conference. It involves six teams from cities across the Western region and represents over 100 years of rugby history and heritage.

The PRP had a short hiatus in 2017, but returned in 2018.

Teams

2019 Teams

Former Teams

Champions

By Year

By Team

References

External links 
 

Rugby union leagues in the United States